Christie or Christy (with various alternative spellings) is a given name, used in English for females. The name Christie originated from Italy in 1222, and derives from the Greek names Christos (a reference to Christ, literally 'anointed one') and Christiana (meaning 'follower of Christ'). The name Christy appears in Ireland in 1345, and is a common masculine name there. When used as a personal name in English, it is usually a diminutive form of the personal names Christian, Christopher, etc. (masculine), or Christine, Christina, etc. (feminine).  The name "Christie" has been assigned other connotations, such as 'angel', 'cute', 'graceful', 'beautiful', 'lovely', even 'princess'.

People with the given name Christy
Christy Brown (1932–1981), Irish writer and painter, author of My Left Foot
Christy Canyon (born 1966), American actress and radio personality
Christy Clark (born 1965), Canadian politician
Christy Chung (born 1970), Canadian-Chinese actress
Christy Goldsmith Romero, American lawyer, Special Inspector General of the Troubled Asset Relief Program
Christy Gibson, Dutch-Thai actress
Christy Hemme (born 1980), American actress, professional wrestling valet, singer, ring announcer, retired professional wrestler, TNA Knockout, and former WWE Diva
Christy Lemire (born 1972), American film critic
Christy Martin (footballer), a former Irish footballer
Christy Martin (boxer) (born 1968), American boxer
Christy Mathewson (1880–1925), American baseball player
Christy Mihos former Independent candidate for the Massachusetts gubernatorial election 2006
Christy Moore (born 1945), Irish folk singer-songwriter 
Christy O'Connor Snr (1924–2016), Irish golfer
Christy O'Connor Jnr (born 1948), nephew of Christy Snr, Irish golfer
Christy Ren (born 1983), Hong Kong former short track speed skater Olympian
Christy Ring (1920–1979), Irish hurler
Christy Carlson Romano (born 1984), American actress
Christy Turlington (born 1969), American supermodel Christy Anning born in Australia

People with the given name Christie
 Christie Allen (1954–2008), English musician
 Christie Ambrosi (b. 1976), American baseball player
 Christie Benet (1879–1951), American politician
 Christie Blatchford (1951–2020), Canadian news reporter
 Christie Brinkley (b. 1954), American model
 Christie Claridge (fl. 1980s), American model
 Christie Clark (b. 1973), American film actress
 Christie Cole (fl. 1990-2000s), American model
 Christie Dawes (b. 1980), Australian paraplegic athlete
 Christie Golden (b. 1963), American author
 Christie Harris (1907–2002), Canadian author
 Christie Hayes (b. 1986), Australian actress
 Christie Hefner (b. 1952), American businesswoman
 Christie Hennessy (1945–2007), Irish musician
 Christie Jayaratnam Eliezer (1918–2001), Sri Lankan-born Australian academic
 Christie Lee Woods (b. 1977), American model
Christie Pudlas (b. 1993), Canadian iconic beauty and nurse
 Christie Macaluso (b. 1945), American Roman Catholic Prelate
 Christie MacFadyen (fl. 1980-2000s), Canadian actress
 Christie Mjolsness (fl. 1980-1990s), Canadian politician and athlete
 Christie Morris (1882–1971), American cricketer
 Christie Rampone (b. 1975), American soccer player and coach
 Christie Ricci (b. 1982), American wrestler
 Christie Ridgway (fl. 1990-2000s), American author
 Christie D. Rowe (born 1978), American earthquake geologist
 Christie Shaner (b. 1984), American soccer player
 Christie Welsh (b. 1981), American soccer player
 Christie Whitman (b. 1946), American politician
 Christie Van Hees (b. 1977), Canadian racquetball player
 Christie Wolf (b. 1966), American bodybuilder and model (Christine, also spelled "Christi")

See also
 Christy (disambiguation)
 Christy (surname)
 Christie (disambiguation)
 Christie (surname)
 Chrystia Freeland

Irish masculine given names
English feminine given names